The Merrimack Warriors represented Merrimack College in the Women's Hockey East Association during the 2015–16 NCAA Division I women's ice hockey season.  It was the inaugural season of the varsity women's ice hockey team.

Roster

2015–16 Warriors

Schedule

|-
!colspan=12 style=""| Regular Season

Awards and honors
Dec 14: Paige Voight named WHEA Rookie of the Week
Jan. 18:  Samantha Ridgewell named WHEA Defensive Player of the Week
Feb. 2: Kaitlyn Rae named WHEA Rookie of the Month 
Mar. 2: Paige Voight, Samantha Ridgewell named to Pro Ambitions All Rookie Team
Mar. 16:  Asst Coach Kacey Bellamy wins Isobel Cup with Boston Pride

References

Merrimack
Merrimack Warriors women's ice hockey seasons
Merri
Merri